Rostrevor is a suburb of Adelaide within the City of Campbelltown and the Adelaide Hills Council. It is located about 10 kilometres east-north-east of the Adelaide city centre. Rostrevor has a creek running through the middle of it, called Fourth Creek, which runs into the River Torrens.

Rostrevor is in the State House of Assembly Electoral district of Morialta and is in the Federal Division of Sturt.

It was named after the village of Rostrevor in Northern Ireland.

Some of the facilities in Rostrevor include Stradbroke School, Foodland, Rostrevor Baptist Church, and a nature playground in Morialta Conservation Park. A new school, the Morialta Secondary School, is being built in Rostrevor. It is being built on the grounds of the former Norwood Morialta School.

Campbelltown City Council has an active boundary change proposal in place to incorporate the Adelaide Hills Council part of Rostrevor along with part of neighbouring Woodforde into its boundaries. This is despite an overwhelming 65% majority of residents and ratepayers opposing it in a survey conducted in 2019.

References

External links
Campbelltown City Council – Boundaries
Adelaide Hills Council – Ward Boundaries

Suburbs of Adelaide